Hampea dukei is a species of flowering plant in the family Malvaceae. It is found only in Panama.

References

dukei
Endemic flora of Panama
Data deficient plants
Taxonomy articles created by Polbot